The Iluiliq National Park Reserve, formerly the Cap-Wolstenholme National Park Reserve, is a protected area located in the far north of Quebec, in Canada. It also contains the third largest colony of Thick-billed Murre in North America.

See also 
 Nunavik
 Cape Wolstenholme
 National Parks of Quebec

Notes and references 

IUCN Category II
National parks of Quebec
Protected areas of Nord-du-Québec
Nunavik